Nikolai Sergeyevich Sysuyev (born 19 May 1999) is a Russian football player who plays for FC Orenburg.

Club career
He made his debut in the Russian Professional Football League for FC Olimpiyets Nizhny Novgorod on 4 June 2017 in a game against FC Syzran-2003. He made his Russian Football National League debut for Olimpiyets on 11 April 2018 in a game against FC Yenisey Krasnoyarsk.

Sysuyev made his Russian Premier League debut for FC Orenburg on 4 March 2023 in a game against FC Akhmat Grozny.

Career statistics

References

External links
 
 
 
 Profile by Russian Professional Football League

1999 births
Sportspeople from Nizhny Novgorod
Living people
Russian footballers
Russia youth international footballers
Association football goalkeepers
FC Nizhny Novgorod (2015) players
FC Orenburg players
Russian Second League players
Russian First League players
Russian Premier League players